The Humber Super Snipe is a car which was produced from 1938 to 1967 by British-based Humber Limited.

Pre-war Super Snipe

The Super Snipe was introduced in October 1938, derived by combining the four-litre inline six-cylinder engine from the larger Humber Pullman with the chassis and body of the Humber Snipe, normally powered by a three-litre engine. The result was a car of enhanced performance and a top speed of  —fast for its day. Its design was contributed to by American engine genius Delmar "Barney" Roos who left a successful career at Studebaker to join Rootes in 1936.

The Super Snipe was marketed to upper-middle-class managers, professional people and government officials. It was relatively low-priced for its large size and performance, and was similar to American cars in appearance and concept, and in providing value for money.

Within a year of introduction, World War II broke out in Europe but the car continued in production as a British military staff car, the Car, 4-seater, 4x2, while the same chassis was used for an armoured reconnaissance vehicle, the Humber Light Reconnaissance Car.

Military operators

: British Army, Royal Navy, RAF

Super Snipe Mark I to III

In 1946, post-war civilian production resumed and the Super Snipe evolved through several versions, each designated by a Mark number, each generally larger, more powerful, and more modern, until production ended in 1957 with the Mark IVB version.

Mk I
The Mark I was essentially a 6-cylinder version of the 1945 Humber Hawk, itself a facelifted pre-war car. A version of the 1930s Snipe remained available, with the 1936-introduced 2731 cc engine. However, the standard Super Snipe engine was the 4086cc side-valve engine that had appeared in the Humber Pullman nearly a decade earlier, in 1936, and which would continue to power post-war Super Snipes until 1952. Throughout the years 1936–1952 the maximum power output of the engine was always given by the manufacturer as 100 bhp at 3400 rpm.

Mk II
 
The Mark II announced in mid-September 1948 was mostly redesigned in chassis and body. Now a full six-seater with a bench-type front seat it was given a wider track and a variable ratio steering unit. The gear lever was now mounted on the steering column. Like Humber's Pullman the headlights were fitted into the wings and running-boards were re-introduced. The transverse-spring independent suspension, first introduced on the Snipe and Pullman in 1935, continued but with 14 leaves instead of eight.

The smaller-engined Snipe was discontinued. Early Mark II Super Snipes can be distinguished by round  lamps below the head lamps. The left one was a fog lamp, and the right one was a "pass" lamp with a low narrow beam for passing cars when using dipped headlights. These were dropped in 1949 in favour of rectangular side lamps which were continued in the Mark III.

The Times motoring correspondent tested the new car at the end of 1948. The spare wheel was criticized as being difficult to extract and the indirect gears were, he thought, not as quiet as they might be. Overall the finish reflected the excellent taste that distinguished Rootes Group products

125 drophead coupés were made by Tickford in 1949 and 1950.

Mk III

The  Mk III followed in August 1950. Easily identifiable by spats over the rear wheels it had a Panhard rod added to the rear suspension which limited sideways movement of the rear wheels and so permitted the use of softer springs. The 1950 car can be readily distinguished from the previous model by the simpler dome-shaped bumpers and the rectangular stainless-steel foot-treads on the running-boards.

The test car cost £1,471 including taxes.

Mk IV

The all-new Mark IV Super Snipe announced mid-October 1952, Earls Court Motor Show time, used a Hawk Mk IV body shell lengthened by  but with a 4138 cc  overhead-valve engine also used in a Rootes Group Commer truck. Chassis and suspension components were uprated to take the greater weight and power of the Super Snipe, those parts ceasing to be interchangeable with those of the Hawk. From 1955, overdrive was available as an option, followed in 1956 by an automatic gearbox.

Shortly after the car's announcement Leslie Johnson, Stirling Moss, and two Rootes Group staff, drove a new silver-grey Super Snipe from Oslo to Lisbon, travelling through fifteen European countries in 3 days, 17 hours and 59 minutes. The run demonstrated the car's high-speed reliability in far from ideal conditions.

In 1953 The Motor tested a Mk IV  and found the larger engine had increased performance with the top speed now  and acceleration from 0- in 14.7 seconds. The test car cost slightly more at £1,481, including taxes.

The Automatic Mk IV saloon tested by The Motor in 1956 Ref. 21/56 Continental, recorded a maximum speed of 97.0 mph (mean) and 98.9 mph (best). 0–60 mph acceleration was 14.8 sec, with a 0–90 in 38.2 sec, The Standing Quarter Mile was 20.4 sec. The axle ratio was 3.7:1 and maximum bhp 122 on a 7.13:1 compression ratio, as stated in the data panel of this road test.

In 1957 The Times commented that the car was handsome if somewhat dated. It attracted favourable attention from passers-by and gave its occupants a satisfying sense of solidity and respectability. The two separate front seats were described as "enormous" and it was noted their backs could be reclined to the horizontal for a passenger to sleep. The steering was described as generally imprecise, uncomfortably low-geared for parking, and in need of power assistance. The car represented "remarkably fine" value for money.

New Super Snipe Series I to V

Series I
In October 1958, a new Super Snipe was introduced and first presented to the public at the opening of the Paris Salon de l'Automobile. Confusingly, the designation returned to the Super Snipe I, but this time the variants were identified by a series number.

This engine was matched to a three-speed manual transmission with optional Laycock de Normanville overdrive on second and top gears, or Borg Warner DG automatic transmission. Power steering was available as an option. Also offered was a touring limousine model with glass partition.

The new car was smaller on the outside, but larger on the inside, with improved performance and the appearance of a reduced size 1955 Chevrolet 4-door sedan.

Series II
A new Zenith carburettor was fitted and the engine's output was raised to 129 bhp at 4800 rpm. A new eight-bladed fan improved engine cooling. Girling  disc brakes were introduced on the front wheels with  drums on the rear axle. A stiffer anti-roll bar was fitted to the front suspension.

The test car cost £1,601 including taxes. The basic car cost £1453.

Series III

The styling of the Series III which the Rootes Group announced in October 1960 was distinguishable by its four headlights and revised full-width grille. This Snipe was the first British car to fit two pairs of headlamps. The suspension of the car had been considerably modified along with the car's floor structure which improved the car's high speed stability. The front of the car was redesigned to give a lower bonnet line. Separate ducts were provided for heating and cooling air to the passenger compartment. The engine received improved bearings with a changed lubrication system and was given better cooling with a quieter fan. Seats were redesigned to give more leg space for back seat passengers.

When tested by The Times complaints focussed on a perceived need for more logical grouping of instruments, a horn ring obstructing the driver's view of the instruments and an over-bright white choke warning light. The power steering seemed to lack "feel". In direct top gear a speed of 95 mph was obtained, less if overdrive had been engaged.

Series IV

For the October 1962 Motor Show there were minor improvements. The rear window was changed to give the roof line an improved appearance and now more nearly match the original 1955 Chevrolet shape. Engine output was now rated at  bhp and the rear axle had been given a higher gear ratio. Manual gearbox cars received a new type of diaphragm clutch made by Borg and Beck and the petrol tank was enlarged from 12.5 to 16 gallons capacity. It can be distinguished by its revised rear-window treatment (doesn't wrap around quite as much as earlier models), Snipe bird badge on grille, opening quarter-light windows in the rear doors, and other trim differences.

Series V and Va
In October 1964 the final Series V version of the Saloon saw an upper body restyle, (also applied to the Hawk Saloon and the Rootes Group's smaller Hillman Super Minx and its derivatives) with a flat roofline and rear window, six-light side windows and a larger, taller windscreen. The Estate body in both marques remained unchanged. Major modifications were made to front and rear suspensions and they required less maintenance. Sound insulation was further improved.

Hydrosteer power steering was available as an optional extra, as was an automatic transmission (Borg Warner Type 35 on Series Va), and metallic paint finishes. The motoring correspondent of the Motoring and Driving Register wrote: "The Humber Super Snipe is an assured car for travelling comfortably from town to town and even on the new fast motorways. Yet its powerful engine allows it to handle the challenges of smaller lanes where the speeds rise and fall with each change of direction and each corner negotiated."

Humber Imperial
Intended to match BMC's Rolls-Royce engined Vanden Plas Princess 4-litre R the Imperial shared the basic specification and performance of the Super Snipe with the addition of a vinyl roof, fully reclining front seats, automatic transmission and hydrosteer power steering as standard. However, a manual 3-speed transmission could be ordered. The car also featured electrically adjustable rear shock absorber settings, a separately controlled rear passenger heater and optional West-of-England cloth-trimmed seats as well as many smaller amenities such as individual reading lamps.

The Rootes Group ceased production of the Series Va version in July 1967, by which time the group was under the control of the American Chrysler Corporation. The last of the big Humbers were assembled by Chrysler in Melbourne, Australia. Plans to introduce a V8 engine, and for the Chrysler 180/2L to be marketed as a Humber in the UK did not materialise, although a small number of Chrysler LA engine (318ci) powered prototypes were built.

Export markets and foreign assembly
While the post-World War II home market for the car continued as before, the Rootes Group also marketed the car for export. The Super Snipe was assembled in Australia, commencing in 1953 with the Mark IV. From 1956 the car was available with automatic transmission, but the model was discontinued shortly afterwards.

Super Snipes were also assembled in New Zealand for a number of years by Rootes Group and Chrysler importer Todd Motors which later became Mitsubishi New Zealand.

References

External links

Rootes Humbers
 Humber range for 1931 sales brochure
  Humber range for 1934-35 sales brochure
 Humber range for 1935 sales brochure
 Humber range for 1939 sales brochure
 Humber Super Snipe series I sales brochure
Post Vintage Humber Car Club
Humber Super Snipe Series I-III 1957-1962  at Phil Seed's Virtual Car Museum
Humber Super Snipe Series III, 1961, Restoration by Kev Warburton
Motorbase entry on the Humber marque

Super Snipe
1940s cars
1950s cars
1960s cars
Cars introduced in 1938
Rear-wheel-drive vehicles